The Margaret River Pro 2014 was an event of the Association of Surfing Professionals for 2014 ASP World Tour.

This event was held from 2 April to 13 April and contested by 36 surfers.

The tournament was won by Michel Bourez (PYF), who beat Josh Kerr (AUS) in final.

Round 1

Round 2

Round 3

Round 4

Round 5

Quarter finals

Semi finals

Final

References
  Site ASP

Margaret River Pro
2014 in surfing
2014 in Australian sport